Liothyrella is a genus of brachiopods belonging to the family Terebratulidae.

The species of this genus are found in Southern Hemisphere.

Species

Species:

Liothyrella affinis 
Liothyrella anderssoni 
Liothyrella archboldi

References

Brachiopod genera
Terebratulida